Man, Woman, Wild was a cable television reality series which originally aired on the Discovery Channel from July 2010 to January 2012. The show features former US Army Special Forces survival expert Mykel Hawke, and his television journalist wife, Ruth England, who have to survive for a half-week with limited supplies in wild and inhospitable locations around the world.

The show focuses on Hawke teaching his wife various survival skills such as starting fire without the aid of modern implements like matches and lighters, locating and treating sources of water, and eating non-traditional forms of food such as insects and wild plants. An emergency crew remained on permanent stand-by during filming and was actually utilized during the first season, for example, when England was overcome by severe heat exhaustion and dehydration in a Mexican desert.

Originally running for two seasons, Man, Woman, Wild's first episode aired on July 16, 2010, and its last episode aired on January 19, 2012. The survival series was not renewed for a third season, which was confirmed by Mykel Hawke via Facebook in January 2012. About the closure, Hawke stated: "The show in its current format was too hard on us and our family, so, we chose to stop".

In 2014, the couple resurrected the format in the Travel Channel series Lost Survivors.

Episodes

Season 1 (2010)
 2010-07-16, Amazon
 2010-07-23, Botswana
 2010-07-30, Louisiana
 2010-08-13, Tasmania
 2010-08-20, Mexico
 2010-08-27, Utah
 2010-09-03, Motukitiu, Aitutaki, Cook Islands
 2010-09-10, Alaska (Denali National Park)
 2010-09-17, Tennessee (The Smoky Mountains)
 2010-09-24, Dominica

Season 2 (2011–2012)
 2011-09-02, Lost at Sea (near Bahamas)
 2011-09-09, Louisiana Firestorm
 2011-09-16, Amazon Jungle Maze
 2011-09-23, Quicksand & Sinkholes (South Andros in the Bahamas)
 2011-09-23, Volcanic Destruction (Montserrat)
 2011-09-30, Message in a Bottle (Pearl Islands, Panama)
 2011-10-07, High Desert Thirst (Anza-Borrego Desert State Park in California)
 2011-10-14, Bear Encounter (Blackfeet Nation in Montana)
 2011-12-29, Bear's Kitchen (Alaska)
 2012-01-05, Newts and Roots (Kentucky)
 2012-01-12, Croatian Cave Odyssey (Velebit caves and mountains, Croatia)
 2012-01-19, Scottish Highlands Peril

See also
 Dual Survival
 Man vs. Wild
 Masters of Survival
 Survivorman
Naked and Afraid

References

External links
 
 

2010s American reality television series
2010 American television series debuts
2012 American television series endings
2010s American documentary television series
Discovery Channel original programming
Works about survival skills